The Finland men's national under-18 basketball team is a national basketball team of Finland, administered by the Basketball Finland. It represents the country in international men's under-18 basketball competitions.

FIBA U18 European Championship results

See also
Finland men's national basketball team
Finland men's national under-17 basketball team
Finland women's national under-18 basketball team

References

External links
Archived records of Finland team participations

Finland national basketball teams
Basketball in Finland
Basketball
Men's national under-18 basketball teams